The More the Merrier is a 1943 American comedy film by Columbia Pictures starring Jean Arthur, Joel McCrea and Charles Coburn, and directed by George Stevens. The film script — from "Two's a Crowd", an original screenplay by Garson Kanin (uncredited) — was written by Richard Flournoy, Lewis R. Foster, Frank Ross and Robert Russell. Set in Washington, D.C., the film presents a comic look at the housing shortage during World War II.

The film received six nominations at the 16th Academy Awards, among them Best Picture, Best Director for Stevens, Best Actress for Arthur, Best Writing (Original Story), and Best Writing (Screenplay). Coburn won Best Supporting Actor.

This film was remade in 1966 as Walk, Don't Run starring Cary Grant, Samantha Eggar and Jim Hutton. The setting was changed to Tokyo which had experienced housing shortages due to the 1964 Summer Olympics.

Plot
Retired millionaire Benjamin Dingle arrives in Washington, D.C. as an adviser on the housing shortage and finds that his hotel suite will not be available for two days. He sees an ad for a roommate and talks the reluctant young woman, Connie Milligan, into letting him sublet half of her apartment. Then Dingle runs into Sergeant Joe Carter, who has no place to stay for several days while waiting to be shipped overseas. Recognizing him as a high minded, clean-cut, attractive young man suitable for Connie, Dingle rents him half of his half.

When Connie finds out about the new arrangement, she orders both men to leave, but is forced to relent because she has already spent the pair's rent. Joe and Connie are attracted to each other, though she is engaged to pompous bureaucrat Charles J. Pendergast. Connie's mother married for love, not security, and Connie is determined not to repeat that mistake. Dingle happens to meet Pendergast at a business luncheon and is put off by what he sees. He decides in earnest that Joe would be a better match for his landlady.

One day, Dingle goes too far, reading aloud to Joe from Connie's private diary, including her thoughts about Joe. When she finds out, she demands they both leave the next day. Dingle takes full blame for the incident, and retreats to his now available hotel room. Rather than turn him out to a sleepless night of roaming the streets, Connie allows Joe to remain in the apartment till the next morning. Joe asks Connie to go to dinner with him. She is reluctant to, but decides she will if Pendergast does not call for her by 8:00 that evening. At 8:00, she and Joe are ready to leave, but a nosy teenage neighbor seeks her advice and delays her until Pendergast arrives downstairs. Seeking to get a look at Connie’s beau, Joe spies on the couple leaving together from the window with a pair of binoculars. When the young neighbor asks what he is doing, Joe flippantly tells him he is a Japanese spy.

Dingle calls Joe to meet him for dinner. There, Dingle bumps into Pendergast and Connie, and pretends he is meeting her for the first time, forcing Joe to do the same. Playing Cupid, Dingle distracts Pendergast in talk about his work, eventually maneuvering him up to his hotel room so that Connie and Joe can be alone together.

Joe walks Connie home. The two share their romantic pasts and end up kissing on the front steps. Inside, a sleepless Joe confesses through his bedroom wall that he loves her. She tells him she feels the same way, but refuses to marry him, as they will soon be forced apart when he leaves for Africa. 

Their cooing and billing is interrupted by the arrival of two brusque FBI agents, who have been tipped off that a Japanese spy is living there. Joe and Connie are taken to FBI headquarters. They identify Dingle as someone who can vouch for Joe’s identity and innocence. Dingle arrives, bringing Pendergast, certain that fireworks will ensue. It comes out during questioning that Joe and Connie live at the same address. When they ask Mr. Dingle to tell Pendergast that their living arrangement is purely innocent, he denies knowing them.

Outside the station, Dingle says he lied to protect his reputation. Taking a taxi home, they all discuss what to do to avoid a scandal. Connie grows angry when Pendergast thinks only of his own reputation. When another passenger in the shared cab turns out to have been a reporter, Pendergast runs after him to try to stop him from writing about his fiancé cohabiting with Joe. 

Dingle assures Connie that if she marries Joe, the crisis will be averted, and they can get a quick annulment afterwards. The couple follow his advice and fly to South Carolina to wed, where a license can be more quickly obtained than in DC. Returning home, Connie allows Joe to spend his final night in her apartment. As Dingle had foreseen, Connie's attraction to Joe may yet overcome her misgivings; this is facilitated by Dingle having conscripted a group of men living downstairs to remove the wall between their two bedrooms. Outside, Dingle changes the ID card on the apartment door to read that it now belongs to Sgt. and Mrs. Carter.

Cast

Production
Jean Arthur got the ball rolling on The More The Merrier, paying playwright and writer Garson Kanin $25,000 to adapt his short story "Two's A Crowd" into a screenplay. She hoped to take the role of Connie and serve out her contract with Columbia Studios, which had become irksome due to her deteriorating relationship with studio boss Harry Cohn. Kanin co-wrote the script with Robert Russell and Frank Ross, Arthur's husband. Arthur also brought director George Stevens (with whom she had recently worked on The Talk of the Town (1942)) and co-star Joel McCrea to the project.

Principal photography took place between September 11 and December 19, 1942, with additional "inserts" filmed in late January 1943.

Stevens, known as a perfectionist, filmed many takes of each scene and shot from multiple angles. McCrea recalled that studio boss Cohn approached him during production, saying “‘What’s that son of a bitch Stevens doing, making all that film? He used more exposed film in one picture than in any five pictures I’ve ever made.”

Stevens was working under a three-film contract at Columbia Studios, and completed the terms of his contract with The More the Merrier. He had previously shot two Cary Grant vehicles at Columbia – melodrama Penny Serenade (1941) and comic drama The Talk of the Town (1942). Immediately after finishing work on The More the Merrier he went to North Africa with the Army’s combat photography unit. The More the Merrier was Stevens' last comedy, as he turned to drama and westerns after the war.

In early drafts, The More The Merrier was titled "Two's a Crowd". Other titles considered included "Washington Story", "Full Steam Ahead", "Come One, Come All" and "Merry-Go-Round", which actually tested best with audiences. Washington officials, though, objected to a title and plot elements that suggested "frivolity on the part of Washington workers". The More the Merrier was finally approved as the title.

McCrea was exhausted by fall 1942, having already shot three movies that year, and signed on to The More the Merrier only at Arthur's request. The pair had a working relationship dating back more than a decade, having met on pre-code romantic melodrama The Silver Horde (1930). McCrea was initially suspicious that the studio was willing to cast him as Joe Carter, feeling that if it was a good part they would have pursued Cary Grant or Gary Cooper, however the role later became his own favorite of his comic performances.

Reception
Contemporary reviews were broadly positive. Bosley Crowther of The New York Times enjoyed The More the Merrier, calling the film "as warm and refreshing a ray of sunshine as we've had in a very late spring". He praised all three leads, the writers, and the director, singling out Coburn as "the comical crux of the film" who "handles the job in fine fettle".

Variety called it "a sparkling and effervescing piece of entertainment."

Harrison's Reports wrote, "Excellent entertainment! George Stevens' masterful direction, and the fine acting of Jean Arthur, Joel McCrea and Charles Coburn, make this one of the brightest and gayest comedies to have come out of Hollywood in many a season."

David Lardner of The New Yorker wrote, "As is the case with a lot of madcap comedies, this one tends to fall apart somewhat toward the end, when all the accumulated mixups are supposed to be resolved without a complete sacrifice of logic but by no means are. As long as these mixups are purely being established, however, and nobody's worrying about clearing them up, everything is fine."

Time Out Film Guide noted in 1943, "Despite a belated drift towards sentimentality, this remains a refreshingly intimate movie."

A review at TV Guide online (as of 2022) characterizes it as "a delightful and effervescent comedy marked with terrific performances" and praises Coburn as "nothing short of superb, stealing scene after scene with astonishing ease".

Through 2017 it had a 94% fresh rating on the Rotten Tomatoes website based on 16 reviews.

Awards
Coburn won the Academy Award for Best Supporting Actor. There were also four nominations:
 Best Picture
 Best Actress in a Leading Role - Arthur 
 Best Director - Stevens
 Best Writing, Original Story - Frank Ross and Robert Russell
 Best Writing, Screenplay - Richard Flournoy, Lewis R. Foster, Ross and Russell 

Stevens won the New York Film Critics Circle Award for Best Director.

Home media
The film was released on Region 1 DVD.

References
Notes

Citations

Bibliography

 Dick,  Bernard. The Merchant Prince of Poverty Row: Harry Cohn of Columbia Pictures. Lexington, Kentucky : University Press of Kentucky, 1993. .
 Harrison, P. S. Harrison's Reports and Film Reviews, 1919–1962. Hollywood, California: Hollywood Film Archive, 1997. .
 Maltin, Leonard.  Leonard Maltin's Movie Encyclopedia. New York: Dutton, 1994. .
 Oller, John. Jean Arthur: The Actress Nobody Knew. New York: Limelight Editions, 1997. .
 Sarvady, Andrea, Molly Haskell and Frank Miller. Leading Ladies: The 50 Most Unforgettable Actresses of the Studio Era. San Francisco: Chronicle Books, 2006. .

External links
 
 
 
 
 
 

1943 films
1943 romantic comedy films
1940s screwball comedy films
American black-and-white films
American romantic comedy films
American screwball comedy films
Columbia Pictures films
1940s English-language films
Films directed by George Stevens
Films featuring a Best Supporting Actor Academy Award-winning performance
Films scored by Leigh Harline
Films set in Washington, D.C.
Films set on the home front during World War II
World War II films made in wartime